The Saturday Press was a literary weekly newspaper, published in New York City from 1858 to 1860 and again from 1865 to 1866, edited by Henry Clapp, Jr.

Clapp, nicknamed the "King of Bohemia" and credited with importing the term "bohemianism" to the U.S, was a central part of the antebellum New York literary and art scene.  Today he is perhaps best known for his spotlighting of Walt Whitman, Fitz-James O'Brien, and Ada Clare – all habitués of the bohemian watering hole named Pfaff's beer cellar – in The Saturday Press.  Clapp intended the Press to be New York's answer to the Atlantic Monthly.  The Press was constantly troubled by financial problems, and Clapp died in poverty and obscurity.

Mark Twain's first short story, "The Celebrated Jumping Frog of Calaveras County", was first published under the title "Jim Smiley and His Jumping Frog" in The Saturday Press in 1865.

References
{{cite web |url=http://upress.kent.edu/books/Lause.htm |Mark A. Lause, The Antebellum Crisis & America's First Bohemians.

External links
 Offers the possibility to browse online through any of the 157 issues of The Saturday Press.

Defunct newspapers published in New York City
Defunct weekly newspapers
1858 establishments in New York (state)
1860 disestablishments in New York (state)
1865 establishments in New York (state)
1866 disestablishments in New York (state)
Newspapers established in 1858
Newspapers established in 1865